Lepidophyma chicoasensis, the Sumidero tropical night lizard, is a species of lizard in the family Xantusiidae. It is a small lizard found in Sumidero Canyon in Chiapas, Mexico, at 600 meters elevation.

References

Lepidophyma
Endemic reptiles of Mexico
Petén–Veracruz moist forests
Reptiles described in 1988